Parallel Processing Letters is a journal published by World Scientific since 1991. It covers the field of parallel processing, including topics such as design and analysis of parallel and distributed algorithms, parallel programming languages and parallel architectures and VLSI circuits.

Scope 
Parallel Processing Letters publishes short papers in the field of parallel processing. This journal has a wide scope and topics covered include:
 theory of parallel computation
 parallel programming languages
 parallel architectures and VLSI circuits
 unconventional computational problems (e.g., time-varying variables, interacting variables, time-varying complexity)
 unconventional computational paradigms (e.g., biomolecular computing, chemical computing, quantum computing)
 parallel programming environments
 design and analysis of parallel and distributed algorithms

Abstracting and indexing 
The journal is abstracted and indexed in:
 Inspec
 DBLP Bibliography Server
 Mathematical Reviews
 io-port.net
 Compendex
 Scopus
 CrossRef
 Google Scholar

References

External links 
 Journal Website

World Scientific academic journals
Computer science journals
Publications established in 1991
English-language journals